Talita de Oliveira Neves Bernardo (born March 4, 1987) is a Brazilian mixed martial artist (MMA), currently competing in the bantamweight division of Invicta FC, where she is the current Invicta FC Bantamweight Champion. She also had a stint in the UFC.

Background
Talita started training Brazilian jiu-jitsu (BJJ) at the age of 22, after she took up the challenge to fight a friend's BJJ student. She won the fight and transitioned into MMA five years later.

Mixed martial arts career

Early career 
Bernardo started her professional MMA career since 2015 and amassed a record of 5-1 before signed by UFC.

Ultimate Fighting Championship
Bernardo made her promotional debut on September 2, 2017 against Marion Reneau at UFC Fight Night: Volkov vs. Struve. She lost the fight via technical knockout in round three.

Bernardo next fight came on January 14, 2018 at UFC Fight Night: Stephens vs. Choi against Irene Aldana. She lost the fight via unanimous decision.

On October 27, Bernardo faced Sarah Moras at UFC Fight Night: Volkan vs. Smith. She won the fight via unanimous decision.

Bernardo was scheduled to face  Jessica-Rose Clark  on May 11, 2019 at UFC 237. However, it was reported on April 3, 2019 Clark pulled out of the bout citing injury and she was replaced by newcomer Melissa Gatto.  In turn, Gatto was pulled from the fight in the days leading up to the event and replaced by Viviane Araújo. Bernardo lost the fight via knockout in the third round.

On March 19, 2020, it was reported that Bernardo was no longer part of the UFC's roster.

Post UFC 
Bernardo made her return on July 24, 2021 at OKTAGON 26 against fellow former UFC fighter, Lucie Pudilová. She won the fight via unanimous decision.

Bernardo was expected to face Katharina Lehner at Invicta FC 48 on July 20, 2022. Lehner withdrew for an undisclosed reason and was replaced by Yana Gadelha. She won the fight by a second-round submission, forcing Gadelha to tap with a rear-naked choke.

Bernardo was rebooked against Katharina Lehner on November 16, 2022 at Invicta FC 50, submitting Lehner with a kimura in the second round.

Bernardo challenged Taneisha Tennant for the Invicta FC Bantamweight Championship at Invicta FC 51 on January 18, 2023. She won the fight by unanimous decision, with all three judges scoring the bout 48–46 in her favor.

Personal life 
Bernardo was a sport teacher prior to fighting MMA professionally. Bernardo has a daughter named Dominique.

Championships and accomplishments 

 Invicta Fighting Championships
 Invicta FC Bantamweight Championship (One time, current)

Mixed martial arts record

|-
|Win
|align=center|10–4
|Taneisha Tennant
|Decision (unanimous)
|Invicta FC 51
|
|align=center|5
|align=center|5:00
|Denver, Colorado, United States
|
|-
|Win
|align=center|9–4
|Katharina Lehner
|Submission (kimura)
|Invicta FC 50
|
|align=center|2
|align=center|4:26
|Denver, Colorado, United States
|
|-
|Win
|align=center|8–4
|Yana Gadelha
|Submission (rear-naked choke)
|Invicta FC 48
|
|align=center|2
|align=center|1:39
|Denver, Colorado, United States
|
|-
|Win
|align=center|7–4
|Lucie Pudilová
|Decision (unanimous)
|OKTAGON 26
|
|align=center|3
|align=center|5:00
|Prague, Czech Republic
|
|-
|Loss
|align=center|6–4
|Viviane Araújo
|KO (punch)
|UFC 237
|
|align=center|3
|align=center|0:48
|Rio de Janeiro, Brazil
|
|-
|Win
|align=center| 6–3
|Sarah Moras
|Decision (unanimous)
|UFC Fight Night: Volkan vs. Smith
|
|align=center| 3
|align=center| 5:00
|Moncton, New Brunswick, Canada
|
|-
|Loss
|align=center| 5–3
|Irene Aldana
|Decision (unanimous)
|UFC Fight Night: Stephens vs. Choi
|
|align=center| 3
|align=center| 5:00
|St. Louis, Missouri, United States
|
|-
|Loss
|align=center| 5–2
|Marion Reneau
|TKO (punches)
|UFC Fight Night: Volkov vs. Struve
|
|align=center| 3
|align=center| 4:54
|Rotterdam, Netherlands
|
|-
|Win
|align=center| 5–1
|Irén Rácz
|Submission (rear-naked choke)
|LFN 5 
|
|align=center| 1
|align=center| 4:09
|Poznań, Poland
|
|-
|Win
|align=center| 4–1
|Gisele Moreira
|Decision (unanimous)
|AFC 41
|
|align=center| 3
|align=center| 5:00
|São José, Brazil
|
|-
|Win
|align=center| 3–1
|Priscila Cristina Dias Batista
|Submission (armbar)
|RF: Rambo Fight
|
|align=center| 1
|align=center| 0:59
|Rio de Janeiro, Brazil
|
|-
|Win
|align=center| 2–1
|Lohanna Correia
|Submission (armbar)
|Maximus Fight 2
|
|align=center| 1
|align=center| 0:40
|Rio de Janeiro, Brazil
|
|-
|Loss
|align=center| 1–1
|Juliana Velasquez
|Decision (unanimous)
|Face to Face 11
|
|align=center| 3
|align=center| 5:00
|Rio de Janeiro, Brazil
|
|-
|Win
|align=center| 1–0
|Nubia Santos do Nascimento
|Submission (rear-naked choke)
|PRVT: Tamoios Fight
|
|align=center| 1
|align=center| 3:34
|Cabo Frio, Brazil
|

See also
List of female mixed martial artists

References

External links
 
 

Living people
1987 births
Brazilian female mixed martial artists
Bantamweight mixed martial artists
Mixed martial artists utilizing Brazilian jiu-jitsu
Brazilian practitioners of Brazilian jiu-jitsu
People awarded a black belt in Brazilian jiu-jitsu
Female Brazilian jiu-jitsu practitioners
Sportspeople from Rio de Janeiro (city)
Ultimate Fighting Championship female fighters